Ernest Mbewe (born 11 November 1994) is a Zambian footballer who plays as a midfielder for Zanaco F.C. and the Zambia national football team.

International career
Mbewe made his senior international debut on 16 July 2016, starting in a 4-0 victory over Eswatini during qualifying for the African Nations Championship. Mbewe was named in the final squad for that tournament after Zambia qualified, appearing in all four matches against Uganda, Ivory Coast, Namibia, and Sudan. Mbewe was also included in Zambia's squad for the 2019 COSAFA Cup, appearing in all three of Zambia's matches as they won the tournament.

Career statistics

International

Honors

International
Zambia
COSAFA Cup Champion: 2019

References

External links

Ernest Mbewe at Sofa Score
Ernest Mbewer at Eurosport

1994 births
Living people
Zanaco F.C. players
Zambia Super League players
Zambian footballers
Zambia international footballers
Association football midfielders
Zambia A' international footballers
2018 African Nations Championship players